Samit Dasgupta is a professor of mathematics at Duke University working in algebraic number theory.

Biography
Dasgupta graduated from Montgomery Blair High School in 1995 and placed fourth in the 1995 Westinghouse Science Talent Search with a project on Schinzel's hypothesis H. He then attended Harvard University, where he received a bachelor's degree in 1999. In 2004, Dasgupta received a PhD in mathematics from University of California, Berkeley under the supervision of Ken Ribet and Henri Darmon.

Dasgupta was previously a faculty member at University of California, Santa Cruz. As of 2020, he is a professor of mathematics at Duke University.

Research
Dasgupta's research is focused on special values of L-functions, algebraic points on abelian varieties, and units in number fields. In particular, Dasgupta's research has focused on the Stark conjectures and Heegner points.

Awards
In 2009, Dasgupta received a Sloan Research Fellowship. He was named a Fellow of the American Mathematical Society, in the 2022 class of fellows, "for contributions to number theory, in particular the theory of special values of classical and p-adic L-functions".

Selected publications

References

External links
 

20th-century  American mathematicians
21st-century  American mathematicians
Number theorists
Living people
Date of birth missing (living people)
Place of birth missing (living people)
Duke University faculty
Harvard University alumni
University of California, Berkeley alumni
University of California, Santa Cruz faculty
Year of birth missing (living people)
Fellows of the American Mathematical Society